Tyler Cameron (born January 31, 1993) is an American television personality, model and general contractor. Cameron received national attention as a contestant on season fifteen of The Bachelorette, starring Hannah Brown, in which Cameron was the season's runner-up. He works as a model with Soul Artist Management in New York City and Next Management Miami.

Early life and education
Cameron was born in Jupiter, Florida, to parents Jeff Cameron and Andrea Hermann Cameron; his mother worked as a realtor in South Florida. Cameron is the eldest of three sons. During the Great Recession, the family suffered economically, resulting in them losing their home and Cameron's parents divorcing.

After graduating from Jupiter Community High School, where he was teammates with Cody Parkey, Matthew Vankeuren, and Matthew Cornwell. Cameron attended Wake Forest University, where he was the backup quarterback for the Wake Forest Demon Deacons football team. After graduating with his bachelor's degree, Cameron enrolled in the Florida Atlantic University College of Business and received a Master of Business Administration degree in 2018.

Professional football

Cameron had initially planned to play football professionally and had been signed as an undrafted free agent by the Baltimore Ravens, but was forced to end his football career after a shoulder injury.

Career
Cameron began his career as a model while a college student, after having been discovered through Instagram. He ultimately went on to sign modeling contracts with Soul Artist Management in New York City and Next Management Miami.

In 2019, Cameron was cast in season fifteen of The Bachelorette, starring former Miss Alabama USA Hannah Brown. Filming took place throughout the spring of 2019, and Cameron was later revealed as a contestant by the American Broadcasting Company (ABC) on May 7, 2019. Cameron went on to place as the runner-up, being eliminated by Brown during the finale episode, aired on July 30, 2019, and filmed in Crete. During the reunion aired the same night, Brown revealed that she had broken up with winner Jed Wyatt after it arose that he was in a relationship with another woman just prior to and during filming. Brown then asked Cameron on a date, to which he accepted, although they ultimately did not end up resuming their relationship. During his tenure on the show, Cameron received widespread media attention for his multiple feminist statements, and for often coming to the defense of Brown after she was the victim of acts of alleged sexism by contestants such as Luke Parker.

After the conclusion of the season, fans of the show and the media alike called on Cameron to be announced as the lead for the upcoming season of The Bachelor. Host Chris Harrison stated that he believed Cameron wouldn't be a suitable choice following media reports of him dating fashion model Gigi Hadid, and Cameron later revealed in an interview that he was in talks to become the Bachelor, but rejected the offer. Ultimately, Peter Weber was chosen as the lead for the twenty-fourth season.

Filmography

Awards and nominations

References

External links

1993 births
American male models
Bachelor Nation contestants
Florida Atlantic University alumni
Living people
Male models from Florida
People from Jupiter, Florida
Television personalities from Florida
Wake Forest Demon Deacons football players
Wake Forest University alumni